Ogden is a city in Yell Township, Boone County, Iowa, United States. The population was 2,007 at the time of the 2020 census, down 1.8% from 2,044 in 2010. It is part of the Boone, Iowa Micropolitan Statistical Area, which is a part of the larger Ames-Boone, Iowa Combined Statistical Area.

History
Ogden was platted in 1866. The town is named for William B. Ogden, a railroad official. A post office has been in operation at Ogden since 1871. Ogden was incorporated in 1878.

Geography
Ogden is located at  (42.040057, -94.030678).

Demographics

2010 census
As of the census of 2010, there were 2,044 people, 829 households, and 580 families living in the city. The racial makeup of the city was 98.9% White, 0.3% Native American, 0.1% from other races, and 0.6% from two or more races. Hispanic or Latino of any race were 1.1% of the population.

There were 829 households, of which 32.6% had children under the age of 18 living with them, 57.3% were married couples living together, 8.4% had a female householder with no husband present, 4.2% had a male householder with no wife present, and 30.0% were non-families. 26.2% of all households were made up of individuals, and 13.1% had someone living alone who was 65 years of age or older. The average household size was 2.43 and the average family size was 2.91.

The median age in the city was 41.6 years. 24.8% of residents were under the age of 18; 6.4% were between the ages of 18 and 24; 23.3% were from 25 to 44; 26.7% were from 45 to 64; and 18.8% were 65 years of age or older. The gender makeup of the city was 49.1% male and 50.9% female.

2000 census
As of the census of 2000, there were 2,023 people, 823 households, and 585 families living in the city. The racial makeup of the city was 99.01% White, 0.05% African American, 0.35% Native American, 0.10% Asian, 0.15% from other races, and 0.35% from two or more races. Hispanic or Latino of any race were 0.79% of the population.

There were 823 households, out of which 31.0% had children under the age of 18 living with them, 60.4% were married couples living together, 7.4% had a female householder with no husband present, and 28.9% were non-families. Of all households, 25.9% were made up of individuals, and 14.7% had someone living alone who was 65 years of age or older. The average household size was 2.41 and the average family size was 2.90.

24.6% are under the age of 18, 7.2% from 18 to 24, 26.3% from 25 to 44, 22.2% from 45 to 64, and 19.7% who were 65 years of age or older. The median age was 39 years. For every 100 females, there were 89.2 males. For every 100 females age 18 and over, there were 84.1 males.

The median income for a household in the city was $41,114, and the median income for a family was $46,949. Males had a median income of $32,054 versus $22,679 for females. The per capita income for the city was $19,542. About 1.2% of families and 2.9% of the population were below the poverty line, including 1.7% of those under age 18 and 3.4% of those age 65 or over.

Notable people
Mike Banks, professional football player in the NFL; tight end for the Arizona Cardinals for one season (2002–03)
Brooklyn Supreme (1928–1948), world-record setting heaviest horse

Education 
Children in Ogden, Iowa attend the Ogden Community School District and Ogden High School.

See also

References

External links

 City of Ogden Website
 City-Data Comprehensive Statistical Data and more about Ogden

Cities in Iowa
Cities in Boone County, Iowa
1866 establishments in Iowa
Populated places established in 1866